The women's 4 × 100 metre freestyle relay event at the 2022 Commonwealth Games was held on 30 July at the Sandwell Aquatics Centre.

Records
Prior to this competition, the existing world, Commonwealth and Games records were as follows:

Schedule
The schedule is as follows:

All times are British Summer Time (UTC+1)

Results

Final

References

Women's 4 x 100 metre freestyle relay
Commonwealth Games